Nicolas Dumont may refer to:

 Nicolas Dumont (water polo) (born 1940), Belgian water polo player
Nicolas Dumont (cyclist) (born 1973), French road cyclist
Nicolas Dumont (field hockey), (born 1991), French field hockey player